VWA is a three-letter abbreviation that may refer to: 



Victorian Workcover Authority, a statutory authority of the state government of Victoria, Australia.
Vaccination Week In The Americas, a public health campaign to promote equitable access to immunization.